Calocheiridius is a genus of pseudoscorpions in the family Olpiidae, containing the following species:

 Calocheiridius africanus Beier, 1955
 Calocheiridius amrithiensis Sivaraman, 1980
 Calocheiridius antushi Krumpál, 1983
 Calocheiridius badonneli Heurtault, 1983
 Calocheiridius beieri (Murthy, 1960)
 Calocheiridius braccatus Beier, 1959
 Calocheiridius centralis (Beier, 1952)
 Calocheiridius congicus (Beier, 1954)
 Calocheiridius crassifemoratus Beier, 1955
 Calocheiridius elegans Murthy & Ananthakrishnan, 1977
 Calocheiridius gabbutti Murthy & Ananthakrishnan, 1977
 Calocheiridius gracilipalpus Mahnert, 1982
 Calocheiridius granulatus Sivaraman, 1980
 Calocheiridius hygricus Murthy & Ananthakrishnan, 1977
 Calocheiridius indicus Beier, 1967
 Calocheiridius intermedius Sivaraman, 1980
 Calocheiridius libanoticus Beier, 1955
 Calocheiridius loebli Beier, 1974
 Calocheiridius mavromoustakisi Beier & Turk, 1952
 Calocheiridius murthii Sivaraman, 1980
 Calocheiridius mussardi Beier, 1973
 Calocheiridius nepalensis Beier, 1974
 Calocheiridius olivieri (Simon, 1879)
 Calocheiridius orientalis Murthy & Ananthakrishnan, 1977
 Calocheiridius rhodesiacus Beier, 1964
 Calocheiridius somalicus (Caporiacco, 1941)
 Calocheiridius sulcatus Beier, 1974
 Calocheiridius termitophilus Beier, 1964
 Calocheiridius viridis Murthy & Ananthakrishnan, 1977

References 

Pseudoscorpion genera
Olpiidae